Ready to fly is an American documentary by William A. Kerig following the true story of the fight of American women's ski jumping athletes Lindsey Van, the rest of her U.S. Women's Ski jumping Team members, Jessica Jerome, Alissa Johnson, Abby Hughes, Sarah Hendrickson and many other elite ski jumping athletes around the world to be part of the Olympic Winter Games. It was first screened during the 2013 Banff Mountain Film Festival.

Narration of the documentary is made by Diana Nyad, an American author, journalist, motivational speaker, and long-distance swimmer. Nyad first got national attention in 1975 when she swam around Manhattan island and in 1979 from the Bahamas to Florida. In 2013, at age 64, after many long-distance swimming exploits, she became the first person confirmed to swim from Cuba to Florida (180 km).  She swam to raise funds for victims of Hurricane Sandy.

Background

Women have been fighting for years to be able to compete in the Winter Olympics’ ski jumping category. Women have always been banned from competing in the Ski Jumping Olympic Competitions since it became an official Olympic Sport in Chamonix Olympic Winter Games in 1924. The documentary states why and how the women decided to do sacrifices and were determined to be allowed to participate in 2014 Sochi's Olympic Winter Games and make their lifelong dream come true. Before they were included in 2014 Sochi's Olympic Winter Games, the women athletes from around the world could compete in national championships and the best among them had the opportunity to ski in the FIS Ski Jumping World Cup. This competition have been hosted yearly in 18 different countries since 1979 and is held by the International Ski Foundation.

Filmmakers

Writer/producer/Director : William A. Kerig
Producer: Scott A. Zeller
Director of Photography: Peter Pilafian
Editor: Steve Haugen
Producer/Marketing: Whitney Childers
2nd Unit Director of Photography: Scott Simper
Assistant Editor: Adam Van Wagoner 
Field Producer: Anna Bloom

Lawsuit
A major part of the documentary is about the lawsuit from the ski jumping elite athletes from five different countries they intended against the International Olympic Council for their exclusion of women in the ski jumping discipline. The main goal was to participate in Vancouver's Olympic Winter Games in 2010, but it never happened.

Fighting Gravity is a 2009 documentary on a similar topic.

Sochi Winter Olympics, the dream coming true
After the film was first screened in 2013, professional athletes were able to compete in the 2014 Sochi Olympic Winter Games.  and the German Carina Vogt was the first woman ever to receive an Olympic gold medal in Ski Jumping.

Medalists

References

Films about Olympic ski jumping
Ski jumping
Documentary films about women's sports
2012 films
2012 documentary films
American sports documentary films
American skiing films
film
American female ski jumpers
2010s English-language films
2010s American films
English-language documentary films